Ramzy Al-Duhami (born 5 January 1972) is a Saudi Arabian show jumping rider. He was born in Riyadh. He competed at the 1996, 2000, 2004, 2008, and the 2012 Summer Olympics, where he was awarded a Bronze medal.

References

External links 

1972 births
Living people
Sportspeople from Riyadh
Saudi Arabian male equestrians
Equestrians at the 1996 Summer Olympics
Equestrians at the 2000 Summer Olympics
Equestrians at the 2004 Summer Olympics
Equestrians at the 2008 Summer Olympics
Equestrians at the 2012 Summer Olympics
Olympic equestrians of Saudi Arabia
Olympic bronze medalists for Saudi Arabia
Olympic medalists in equestrian
Medalists at the 2012 Summer Olympics
Equestrians at the 2010 Asian Games
Equestrians at the 2018 Asian Games
Asian Games gold medalists for Saudi Arabia
Asian Games bronze medalists for Saudi Arabia
Asian Games medalists in equestrian
Medalists at the 2010 Asian Games
Medalists at the 2018 Asian Games